Anne-Marie Blaney (born September 9, 1993) is an American long-distance runner. In 2019, she competed in the senior women's race at the 2019 IAAF World Cross Country Championships. She finished in 51st place.

References

External links
 

Living people
1993 births
Place of birth missing (living people)
American female cross country runners
American female long-distance runners
21st-century American women
UCF Knights women's track and field athletes
20th-century American women